Darreh Bid or Darreh-ye Bid or Darrehbid may refer to:
 Darreh Bid, Kiar, Chaharmahal and Bakhtiari Province
 Darreh Bid, Kuhrang, Chaharmahal and Bakhtiari Province
 Darreh Bid, Bazoft, Kuhrang County, Chaharmahal and Bakhtiari Province
 Darreh Bid, Faridan, Isfahan Province
 Darreh Bid, Tiran and Karvan, Isfahan Province
 Darreh Bid, Khuzestan
 Darreh Bid, Kohgiluyeh and Boyer-Ahmad
 Darreh Bid-e Deli Gerdu, Kohgiluyeh and Boyer-Ahmad Province
 Darreh Bid-e Jowkar, Kohgiluyeh and Boyer-Ahmad Province
 Darreh Bid-e Murzard, Kohgiluyeh and Boyer-Ahmad Province
 Darreh Bid, alternate name of Darreh Bidi Sefidar, Kohgiluyeh and Boyer-Ahmad Province